Naledi Nokukhanya Chirwa (born 22 July 1993) is a South African feminist, legislator and former student activist serving as a Member of the National Assembly of South Africa. A member of the Economic Freedom Fighters (EFF), she was sworn in as an MP on 22 May 2019. She is one of the youngest MPs of the 6th Parliament. Chirwa was involved in the #FeesMustFall student protests that occurred at the University of Pretoria between 2015 and 2016.

Early life and education
Chirwa was born on 22 July 1993 in Vosloorus, East Rand, in the former Transvaal Province. She was raised by her grandmother in Mamelodi, Pretoria. In 2009, she served as the deputy president of the Tshwane North College FET (now known as the Tshwane North College TVET). She was only 15 years old at that time. Chirwa earned a Bachelor of Arts and a Honours degree in Drama and Film Studies at the University of Pretoria. She is currently pursuing a Master of Arts in Theatre and Performance at the University of the Witwatersrand.

Political career
She joined the Economic Freedom Fighters in 2015 and became a member of the party's Student Command at the University of Pretoria. She was appointed as the command's communications officer. In August 2016, during former president Jacob Zuma's speech at the IEC election centre following the 2016 municipal elections, Chirwa and three other student activists disrupted his speech while holding up signs reading "Khanga", "Remember Khwezi",  "I am 1 in 3" and "10 yrs later", in reference to Zuma's rape trial of the mid-2000s.

Also in 2016, Chirwa was involved in student protests relating to the #FeesMustFall movement. She was later arrested and suspended on campus as part of her bail conditions. In 2017, she was one of the Mail & Guardian's 200 Young South Africans.

Parliamentary career 
In May 2019, she was elected to the National Assembly and became the youngest EFF MP. Chirwa serves alongside other student activists, including Peter Keetse, Nompendulo Mkhatshwa and Vuyani Pambo. On 25 June 2019, she delivered her maiden speech at the debate of the State of the Nation Address. She was forced to withdraw a comment about the government being complicit in the murders of #FeesMustFall activists. Chirwa serves on the Portfolio Committee on Health in parliament.

In January 2022, Chirwa was criticised for calling President Cyril Ramaphosa "toothless" and a "weak little boy".

Personal life
Chirwa has one child. In October 2022, Chirwa announced that she is married.

Nationality 
Since becoming an MP, Chirwa's nationality has been questioned. In January 2022, Chirwa responded to the allegations that she is not a South African by tweeting: “You can lie to yourselves about my nationality until you turn green in the buttocks. It will not make your lies the truth and neither will it ever silence me. I didn’t buy my voice. I’m not renting it either. Rest assured, I will always speak and there’s nothing you can do about it."

References

External links
Naledi Nokukhanya Chirwa – People's Assembly

Living people
1993 births
Economic Freedom Fighters politicians
Members of the National Assembly of South Africa
People from Mamelodi
People from Vosloorus
People from Pretoria
People from Gauteng
University of Pretoria alumni
South African feminists